Water polo was contested by men's teams at the 1974 Asian Games in Aryamehr Swimming Pool, Tehran, Iran from September 2 to September 7, 1974.

The host team Iran won the gold medal in the round robin competition by having a better goal difference than China and Japan. The winner also qualified for the 1975 World Championships and the 1976 Summer Olympics.

Medalists

Results
All times are Iran Standard Time (UTC+03:30)

Final standing

References
 All Asian Games Results

External links
 todor66.com

 
1974 Asian Games events
1974
Asian Games
1974 Asian Games